Eric Johnson (born August 20, 1953) is an American politician that served in the Georgia State Senate representing the 1st District, comprising all of Bryan and Liberty counties and part of Chatham County.  He resigned his seat in 2009, after years in the Georgia General Assembly.  He was a candidate for Governor of Georgia, looking to succeed term-limited Sonny Perdue in 2010.

A Republican, he was first elected to the Georgia House of Representatives in 1992, giving up his seat after one term to run for the state senate. He was reelected to the state senate in 1996. His colleagues voted him as the Minority Leader in 1998 and served until 2003. In 2003 following the 2002 election of the first Republican Governor in over 130 years, several Democrats changed parties and Republicans gained the state senate majority. Eric was elected as the Senate President Pro Tempore.  The Republican majority stripped Democratic Lieutenant Governor  Mark Taylor of most of his powers, so for all intents and purposes, Johnson served as lieutenant governor.  The power of the lieutenant governor was restored back to current lieutenant governor Casey Cagle, a Republican, in 2007.

Background 
He was born in New Orleans, Louisiana, and is of the Christian faith.  He makes his career as an architect.

Professional career 
Architect, North Point Real Estate, 2006–present  
Architect/vice president, Hussey, Gay, Bell and Deyoung International, 1986–present

Education 
Senator Johnson graduated with a Bachelor's and master's degree in architecture from Tulane University in 1976.

Career 

Johnson has always been involved in politics—from local to national:

Senator, Georgia State Senate, 1994–2009 
Minority Leader, Georgia State Senate, 1999–2003 
Minority Whip, Georgia State Senate, 1997–1998 
Representative, Georgia House of Representatives, 1992–1994 
Chair, Chatham County Republican Party, 1987–1989 
Regional director, United States Senator Mack Mattingly, 1981–1983

Johnson is a Republican and served as a member of the Georgia House of Representatives from 1993 to 1995.  He represented the 1st District in the Georgia State Senate beginning in 1995, and became the institution's President Pro Tempore in 2005.

Over the years, his committee assignments have included Appropriations, Assignments, Banking & Financial Institutions, Consumer Affairs, Economic Development, Tourism & Cultural Affairs, Ethics, Finance & Public Utilities, Natural Resources and the Environment, Regulated Industries and Utilities, Rules and Transportations.

Election history

Campaign for Governor

In 2009, Johnson filed paperwork with the Georgia State Ethics Commission to run for governor in 2010.
He came up short in the Republican primary, finishing just short of the runoff to Karen Handel and Nathan Deal.

References

External links 
 Johnson for Georgians Campaign Website
 Georgia Legislature – Senator Eric Johnson official government site
 Project Vote Smart – Senator Eric B. Johnson (GA) profile
 Follow the Money – Eric Johnson
 2006 2004 2002 2000 1998 1996 1994 Senate campaign contributions
 Eric Johnson as Senate President Pro Tem

|-

|-

|-

|-

1953 births
Living people
American architects
Republican Party Georgia (U.S. state) state senators
Republican Party members of the Georgia House of Representatives
Politicians from New Orleans
Presidents pro tempore of the Georgia State Senate
Tulane University alumni
Architects from New Orleans
21st-century American politicians